Jackson Stewart (born June 30, 1980 in Santa Clara, California) is an American former road racing cyclist, who last rode for the BMC Racing Team.

Multifaceted
Jackson started racing in his early teens and developed as a rider as part of the Los Gatos Bicycle Racing Club's junior program and through racing at the Hellyer Park Velodrome in San Jose, California. While still an under-23 (Espoir) rider Jackson raced for a season in Italy. He is unique to have competed at a high level in events on the road, track, and cyclocross. In recent years  he has focused on road racing exclusively and is known as a solid all-around rider and fast finisher.

Velodrome
On the velodrome Jackson was the 2003 National Madison Champion with partner Erik Saunders.

Road Racer
At the end of the 2006 season, he was selected to represent USA at the 2006 Road World Championships. In 2008 Jackson competed at the Tour of Qatar amongst numerous UCI Pro-Tour level teams and has also competed in the famed Paris-Roubaix classic for the BMC Pro Cycling Team. Domestically, Jackson won the Redlands criterium in 2009.

Education
Away from cycling, he earned his degree in Business Management from San Jose State University.

Achievements

2003
1st U.S. National Track Championships – Madison
5th U.S. National Cyclo Cross Championships
1st Superweek Downers Ave. Criterium
2nd Tour De Toona Stage 4
United States World Cyclo-Cross Championship Team Member
2004
5th U.S. National Cyclo Cross Championships
1st Infineon Raceway Criterium
12th Tour of Georgia Stage 2
12th Tour of Georgia Stage 7
1st Santa Nella Road Race
1st Tower District Criterium
United States World Cyclo-Cross Championship Team Member
2005
1st Cat’s Hill Criterium
1st Burlingame Criterium
7th USPRO Criterium
2006
United States World Road Race Championship Team Member
1st Commerce Bank Triple Crown – Lancaster
1st Pacific Bank Criterium
2nd Garret Lemire Ojai Criterium
2nd McClane Criterium
2nd Fitchburg Longsjo Classic Stage 4
2nd Bank of America Criterium
4th Sea Otter Circuit Race
5th Nature Valley Grand Prix Stage 3
6th Raleigh Criterium
7th Fitchburg Longslo Classic Overall
8th Tour of California Stage 4
9th Redlands Classic Stage 4
9th Athens Twilight Criterium
10th Chris Thater Criterium
Tour of California Stage 1 – Aggressive Rider Jersey
2007
1st TTT Giro Della Friuli Venezia Stage 4
2nd Mt. Hamilton Road Race
5th Nevada City Classic
2008
1st Cherry Pie Criterium
1st Watsonville Criterium
Tour of California Stage 1 – KOM Jersey
Tour of California Stage 1 – Aggressive Rider Jersey
2009
Competed in the 2009 Paris-Roubaix
1st Cat’s Hill Criterium
1st Redlands Classic Stage 3
1st San Jose Criterium
1st Snelling Road Race
4th Elk Grove Stage 1
4th Elk Grove Stage Race Overall
4th MERCO Criterium
6th Cascade Classic Stage 4
15th Tour of Picardie Stg. 3

External links

1980 births
Living people
American male cyclists